The blue-eye lanternshark, also known as the traveller lanternshark or slate lanternshark (Etmopterus viator)  is a shark of the family Etmopteridae.

Distribution and habitat 
It is found in the northern part of the Kerguelen Plateau in the Southern Ocean, off New Zealand and South Africa. It has been confirmed to be present at the Macquarie Ridge.

Anatomy 
It is a medium-sized Etmopterus species with a fusiform body.

Conservation status 
In June 2018 the New Zealand Department of Conservation classified the blue-eye lanternshark as "Data Deficient" under the New Zealand Threat Classification System.

References 

Etmopterus
Fish described in 2011